The dram (sign: ֏; abbreviation: դր.; ISO code: AMD) is the currency of Armenia, and is also used in the neighboring unrecognized Republic of Artsakh. It was historically subdivided into 100 luma. The Central Bank of Armenia is responsible for issuance and circulation of dram banknotes and coins, as well as implementing the monetary policy of Armenia.

The word "dram" translates into English as "money" and is cognate with the Greek drachma and the Arabic dirham, as well as the English weight unit dram. The first instance of a dram currency was in the period from 1199 to 1375, when silver coins called dram were issued.

History 
On 21 September 1991, a national referendum proclaimed Armenia as a republic independent from the Soviet Union. The Central Bank of Armenia, established on 27 March 1993, was given the exclusive right of issuing the national currency.

In the immediate aftermath of the collapse of the Soviet Union attempts were made to maintain a common currency (the Russian rouble) among CIS states. Armenia joined this rouble zone. However it soon became clear that maintaining a currency union in the unstable political and economical circumstances of the post-Soviet states would be very difficult. The Rouble Zone effectively collapsed with the unilateral monetary reform in Russia, 1993. As a result, the states that were still participating (Kazakhstan, Uzbekistan, Turkmenistan, Moldova, Armenia and Georgia) were 'pushed out' and forced to introduce separate currencies. Armenia was one of the last countries to do so when it introduced the dram on 22 November 1993.

Armenian dram sign 

After its proclamation of independence, Armenia put into circulation its own national currency, the Armenian Dram; this required a monetary sign. As the result of common business practice and the unique pattern of Armenian letters, the shape of the sign and its variations appeared in the business scratches (daybooks). Until the official endorsement of the sign a number of artists and businessmen developed and offered various shapes for it. Now the dram symbol is included in the Armenian standard for the national characters and symbols and in the Armenian computer fonts. The current standard sign for the Armenian dram (֏,; ; code: AMD) was designed in 1995.

Coins
In 1994, a first series of aluminium coins was introduced in denominations of 10, 20, and 50 luma, 1, 3, 5, and 10 drams. 
In 2003 and 2004, a second series consisting of 10, 20, 50, 100, 200 and 500 dram coins was introduced to replace the first series.

The Central Bank has also issued a great number of commemorative coins intended for sale to collectors. A listing can be found at the authorized central bank distributors.

First series (1994-2002)
In 1994, a first series of aluminium coins was introduced in denominations of 10, 20, and 50 luma, 1, 3, 5, and 10 drams. The other coins are officially in circulation but rarely used because of their low nominal value.

 All coins bear the year of the first issue (1994).

Second series (2003-present)
In 2003 and 2004, a new series of coins was introduced in denominations of 10, 20, 50, 100, 200 and 500 drams.

 All coins bear the year of the first issue (2003 or 2004).

Banknotes
A first series of banknotes was issued in November 1993. It was withdrawn from circulation by 2005. 
A second series was issued from 1998 onwards which is still in use at present.

First series (1993-1998)
On 22 November 1993, banknotes of 10, 25, 50, 100, 200, and 500 drams were issued. 
Notes for ֏1,000 and ֏5,000 were put into circulation later.

Second series (1998-2017) 
Banknotes of ֏50, ֏100, and ֏500 are rarely seen in circulation. Coins of ֏50, ֏100, and ֏500 are used instead.
A commemorative ֏50,000 note was issued on 4 June 2001 in commemoration of the 1,700th anniversary of the adoption of Christianity in Armenia.

Third series (2017-present)
A third series of Armenian dram banknotes were issued in 2017, to commemorate the 25th anniversary of Armenia's national currency. All denominations for this series are the same as its previous issues, with the 2,000 dram banknote as a newly introduced denomination, the 50,000 dram banknote re-issued for this series and the omission of the 50, 100, and 100,000 dram banknotes for this issue. The new series are printed on hybrid substrates of Louisenthal. 

The first three denominations, ֏10,000, ֏20,000 and ֏50,000, were issued on November 22, 2018. The final three denominations, ֏1,000, ֏2,000 and ֏5,000 were issued on December 25, 2018. 

A 500 dram commemorative note was issued on 22 November 2017 to commemorate the story of Noah's Ark.

Exchange rates
The modern dram came into effect on 22 November 1993, at a rate of Rbls 200 = 1 dram (US$1 = 404 drams). The dram is not pegged to or by any currency other than the Artsakh dram.

See also
Artsakh dram
Economy of Armenia
List of currencies
List of currencies in Europe
List of circulating currencies

References

External links
 Central Bank of Armenia
 Central Bank of Armenia next day USD to AMD exchange rate prediction Engine
 Armenian Dram Sign History, shape, and promotion of Armenian Dram Sign
 Coin Types from Armenia Lists, pictures, and values of Armenian coin types
 
 The banknotes of Armenia 

Economy of Armenia
Currencies introduced in 1993
Currencies of Armenia